Chaetostoma anale is a species of catfish in the family Loricariidae. It is a freshwater species native to South America, where it occurs in the Orteguaza River basin, which is part of the Japurá River drainage in Colombia. The species reaches 16 cm (6.3 inches) in total length.

References 

Fish of Colombia
anale
Fish described in 1943